Kopaonik is a village located in the municipality of Raška, Serbia. According to the 2011 census, the village has a population of 19 inhabitants.

References

Populated places in Raška District
Kopaonik